Partha Bhowmick is an Indian politician from the state of West Bengal who belongs to All India Trinamool Congress. He is a three term member of the West Bengal Legislative Assembly From Naihati. He is Secretary of West Bengal Vidhan Sabha Parisad also known as Deputy Whip of West Bengal Legislative Assembly. He is also District President of North 24 Parganas of All India Trinamool Youth Congress. Now he is President of newly made organizational district Dumdum - Barrackpur of All India Trinamool Congress.

Constituency
He represents the Naihati (Vidhan Sabha constituency).

Political Party
He is from the All India Trinamool Congress.

References 

West Bengal MLAs 2011–2016
West Bengal MLAs 2016–2021
Living people
Trinamool Congress politicians from West Bengal
1964 births